Zephyranthes insularum, common name rainlily, is a bulbous flowering plant in the family  Amaryllidaceae, subfamily Amaryllidoideae, native to Cuba and reportedly naturalized in Florida and in parts of Mexico.

Zephyranthes insularum is a small bulb-forming perennial no more than 30 cm tall. Flowers are trumpet-shaped, white to very pale pink.

Taxonomy
Zephyranthes insularum H.H.Hume ex Moldenke (i.e. the species named by Hume) is accepted by the World Checklist of Selected Plant Families as a distinct species. Zephyranthes insularum auct. non Hume (i.e. a name applied by some authors other than in the sense intended by Hume) is a synonym of Zephyranthes puertoricensis.

References

External links
photo of herbarium specimen at Missouri Botanical Garden, lectotype of Zephyranthes insularum 

insularum
Garden plants
Plants described in 1952
Flora of Cuba
Flora of Florida
Flora of Mexico
Flora without expected TNC conservation status